Josy Moinet (23 October 1929 – 4 August 2018) was a French politician who served as a Senator for Charente-Maritime from 1973 to 1989, and as Mayor of Saint-Rogatien from 1959 to 2008, representing the PRG.

References

1929 births
2018 deaths
French Senators of the Fifth Republic
Mayors of places in Nouvelle-Aquitaine
Senators of Charente-Maritime
Officiers of the Légion d'honneur
Radical Party of the Left politicians
21st-century French politicians
20th-century French politicians